Colin McDonald King  (born 19 December 1949) is a New Zealand politician who first entered Parliament in . In late 2013, he lost the National Party selection process for the  electorate for the 2014 general election.

Early years and family
King was born in 1949 in Canterbury. He is a farmer from Marlborough, and has held senior roles in various boards and trusts relating to the agricultural sector. In the 2000 Queen's Birthday Honours, he was appointed a Member of the New Zealand Order of Merit, for services to shearing and the wool industry. King is married and has four adult children.

King has had a successful sheep-shearing career and is the only left-handed shearer to ever win the Open Golden Shears in 1982. He went on to win the same title in 1987 and 1988. King was also appointed to the NZ Meat Board in 2000 representing the Northern South Island farmers for two terms before entering parliament in 2005.

Member of Parliament

In the 2005 election, King was a candidate for the National Party, standing in the Kaikoura electorate and being ranked 42nd on the party list. He won the Kaikoura electorate receiving 17,755 votes, a margin of 4,675 over the second placed candidate Brendon Burns and entered Parliament.

In the 2008 election he successfully retained the Kaikoura electorate and increased his vote and the Party vote but was moved further down the list.

In 2011 King tied with Melissa Lee for the title of "Worst performing National MP" in the Trans Tasman Political Week's annual "Political Performance Roll-Call".

In 2012 King voted against the first reading Marriage Amendment Bill.

Leaving Parliament

In 2013, King was deselected as National's candidate for Kaikoura, losing a selection challenge by Stuart Smith. King did not attend several leaving function for retiring National MPs, most notably refusing to appear on stage at the National Party annual conference with the other departing MPs. Since leaving Parliament, King has been maintaining a low profile but is now working as a consultant in the primary industries and tertiary education sectors.

King contested the mayoralty of the Marlborough District Council at the 2016 New Zealand local elections, but lost to Blenheim ward councillor John Leggett.

References

1949 births
Living people
Members of the New Zealand Order of Merit
New Zealand farmers
New Zealand National Party MPs
Members of the New Zealand House of Representatives
New Zealand MPs for South Island electorates
21st-century New Zealand politicians
New Zealand sheep shearers